Mazzinghi CP405 is a deep-sea FPV - Fishery Patrol Vessel of the Italian Coast Guard, built in Bacino di Carenaggio Spa, Trapani shipyard.

Features

The Mazzinghi CP405 patrol boat class was built in four vessels, with hull in steel FE510D.

Vessels

References 

Patrol boat classes
Ships built in Italy
Corps of the Port Captaincies – Coast Guard